Tigress with Her Cubs is a 1620 Flemish oil painting, attributed either to Peter Paul Rubens or Jan Wildens. It is now in the Akademie der Bildenden Kunste, Vienna.

References

1620 paintings
Paintings by Peter Paul Rubens
Paintings in the collection of the Academy of Fine Arts Vienna
Tigers in art